The Qualification of Women (County and Borough Councils) Act 1907 was as Act of Parliament (7 Edw. VII) that clarified the right of certain women ratepayers to be elected to Borough and County Councils in England and Wales. It followed years of uncertainty and confusion, which included challenges in the courts when women first tried to stand for the London County Council.

Women had been elected to separate boards dealing with the Poor Law and the Elementary Education Act 1870 and were entitled to serve on the new urban and rural district councils from 1894. Women had lost their influence on education boards when the free-standing boards were absorbed into the newly established councils. Women had also lost places when towns grew and obtained Borough status. The 1907 Act which was seen as a victory for the Women's Local Government Society gave widows and unmarried women the right to stand anywhere in local government.

Five women were elected in 1907: Elizabeth Garrett Anderson in Aldeburgh, Edith Sutton in Reading, Sarah Elizabeth Woodward in Bewdley, Sophia Merivale in Oxford, and Mrs Dove in Wycombe. Marjory Lees was elected as an alderman in Oldham at a by-election shortly after the regular elections.  Numbers of councillors gradually increased, with Mrs Hughes in Oxford and Margaret Ashton in Manchester winning seats in 1908, Eleanor Rathbone in Liverpool, Helen Hope in Bath, Miss Coulcher in Ipswich and Mrs Chapman in Worthing in 1909, Ada Newman in Walsall, Elizabeth Bannister in Southend and Maud Burnett in Tynemouth in 1910, and Ellen Hume in Pinsent and Marjorie Pugh in Birmingham, Mrs Redford in Manchester and Alison Ogilvy in Godalming in 1911.

References

United Kingdom Acts of Parliament 1907
1907 in law
Election law in the United Kingdom
Election legislation
Women's rights in the United Kingdom
Women's rights legislation
1907 in women's history
History of women in the United Kingdom